Mohamed "Ahmed" Kanu (born 5 July 1968 in Freetown) is a Sierra Leonean manager and retired footballer. He used to play as centre back or libero. He managed the national team of Sierra Leone from 2005 to 2007.

He made his international debut for Sierra Leone in 1987 at the age of 19.

Kanu has also had Belgian citizenship since 2002.

During his five-year stay at Cercle Brugge, Kanu was twice voted the best player of the season by the fans, winning the Pop Poll in 2000 and 2003.

References

External links
 Cerclemuseum.be 
 Player info at Cerclebrugge.be 

1968 births
Living people
Sportspeople from Freetown
Sierra Leonean footballers
Association football defenders
Mighty Blackpool players
S.C. Eendracht Aalst players
F.C.V. Dender E.H. players
K.V. Oostende players
K.S.K. Beveren players
Cercle Brugge K.S.V. players
Challenger Pro League players
Belgian Pro League players
Sierra Leone international footballers
1994 African Cup of Nations players
1996 African Cup of Nations players
Sierra Leonean expatriate footballers
Sierra Leonean expatriate sportspeople in Belgium
Expatriate footballers in Belgium
Sierra Leonean football managers
Sierra Leone national football team managers